Martin Taylor (born 9 December 1966) is an English former footballer. He was a goalkeeper.
During his time at Wycombe, Taylor went on to miss just seven League games in four seasons, culminating in a clean sweep of the Player of the Season awards in May 2001. This followed a season where the ex-Derby 'keeper was not only ever-present with a staggering 63 appearances but also achieved hero status during the record breaking FA Cup run. The Fifth Round replay against Wimbledon at Selhurst Park is an evening that will never be forgotten for Taylor and the Wycombe fans who were there. Taylor saved a penalty in the last minute of normal time and then scored from the spot himself in the penalty shoot-out.

External links

1966 births
Living people
Sportspeople from Tamworth, Staffordshire
English footballers
Association football goalkeepers
Mile Oak Rovers F.C. players
Derby County F.C. players
Carlisle United F.C. players
Scunthorpe United F.C. players
Crewe Alexandra F.C. players
Wycombe Wanderers F.C. players
Barnsley F.C. players
Telford United F.C. players
Burton Albion F.C. players
Burton Albion F.C. non-playing staff
Derby County F.C. non-playing staff
English Football League players
Premier League players
National League (English football) players